The 1994 Big Sky Conference men's basketball tournament was the nineteenth edition, held  at the BSU Pavilion at Boise State University in Boise, Idaho.

Fifth-seeded host Boise State upset second-seeded  in the championship game, to repeat as tournament champions and gain their fourth tournament title overall. The Broncos had defeated regular season champion  in the semifinals.

Format
Conference membership remained at eight and the tournament format was unchanged, with an exception; the site was predetermined, rather than awarded to the regular season champion. 

The top six teams from the regular season participated, and the top two earned byes into the semifinals. The remaining four played in the quarterfinals, and the top seed met the lowest remaining seed in

Bracket

NCAA tournament
The Broncos  received an automatic bid to the NCAA tournament; no other Big Sky members were invited to the tournament or  Boise State was seeded fourteenth in the West regional and lost by nine points to Louisville in the first round  It was the twelfth consecutive year that the Big Sky representative lost in the first round.

See also
Big Sky Conference women's basketball tournament

References

Big Sky Conference men's basketball tournament
Tournament
Big Sky Conference men's basketball tournament
Big Sky Conference men's basketball tournament
Basketball competitions in Boise, Idaho
College sports tournaments in Idaho